N91 may refer to:

 , a submarine of the Royal Navy
 London Buses route N91
 Nebraska Highway 91, in the United States
 Nokia N91, a mobile phone